This is a list of events from the year 1805 in Ireland

Events
August – rebel leader Michael Dwyer, held without sentence in Kilmainham Gaol, is transported to Sydney (Australia), where he lands as a free settler in February 1806.
21 October – Battle of Trafalgar: a British Royal Navy fleet led by Admiral Horatio Nelson defeats a combined French and Spanish fleet off the coast of Spain. Almost 4,000 of the 18,000 men on the British ships were born in Ireland.

Publications
 Mary Tighe's poem Psyche, or the Legend of Love

Births
2 January – John Hogan, businessman and United States Representative from Missouri (died 1892).
5 April – Samuel Forde, painter from Cork (died 1828).
4 August – William Rowan Hamilton, mathematician, physicist, and astronomer (died 1865).
Full date unknown
Jon Riley, deserter from United States Army, a founder of the San Patricios (died 1850).
Anthony Coningham Sterling, British Army officer and historian (died 1871).
William Thompson, naturalist (died 1852).

Deaths
27 April – William Trench, 1st Earl of Clancarty, politician and statesman (born 1741).
7 May – William Petty, 2nd Earl of Shelburne, British Whig statesman, Home Secretary in 1782 and Prime Minister 1782–1783 (born 1737).
18 June – Arthur Murphy, editor and writer (born 1727).
27 July – Brian Merriman, Irish language poet and teacher (b. c. 1749).
August – John Talbot Dillon, traveller and historical writer (b. c. 1740).
8 December – Rose ffrench, 1st Baroness ffrench.

References

 
Years of the 19th century in Ireland
1800s in Ireland
Ireland
 Ireland